Chhatrapati Shahu Football Stadium is a historic football stadium in Kolhapur, Maharashtra, India.

Name
The stadium is named in honour of Chhatrapati Shahu Maharaj, the Maharaja of the Indian princely state of Kolhapur Who has built this Stadium.

Usage
Santosh Trophy matches of 2022–23 season took place here. The clubs of KSA district leagues use the stadium. The leagues are conducted by the Kolhapur Sports Association. It is also the home stadium for FC Kolhapur City.

See also 
 Shri Chhatrapati Shivaji Stadium
 Khasbag Wrestling Stadium

References

External links 
 Stadium overview at Soccerway
 Stadium overview – Kolhapur Sports Association

Kolhapur
Football venues in Maharashtra
1960 establishments in Maharashtra
Sports venues completed in 1960
20th-century architecture in India